Plasmodium accipiteris is a parasite of the genus Plasmodium.

Like all Plasmodium species P. accipiteris has both vertebrate and insect hosts. The vertebrate hosts for this parasite are birds.

Taxonomy
The parasite was first described by Paperna et al. in 2007.

Distribution
This parasite is found in Israel.

Vectors
Not known.

Hostsy
P. accipiteris infects the Levant sparrowhawk (Accipiter brevipes).

References

accipiteris
Parasites of birds